Events from the year 1612 in Quebec.

Events
Following the death of Charles de Bourbon, comte de Soissons, king Louis XIII appoints Henry II de Bourbon, prince de Condé new Lieutenant General of New France.
Samuel de Champlain designs one of the first maps of North America

Births
Louis d'Ailleboust de Coulonge, Governor of New France (died 1660)

Deaths

References

1610s in Canada
Quebec, 1612 In
Years in Quebec